John Thomas Brown (24 November 1874 – 12 April 1950) was an English first-class cricketer.

Born in Snape Hill, Darfield, Yorkshire, England, Brown was a right arm fast bowler and right-handed tail end batsman.  He played thirty matches for Yorkshire between 1897 and 1903. He took 97 wickets, with a best of 8 for 40 against Gloucestershire, at an average of 21.35. He took 5 wickets in an innings eight times, and 10 wickets in a match on two occasions. His best innings, a knock of 37*, came against Nottinghamshire.

He died in April 1950, in Duckmanton, Derbyshire.  His brother, William Brown, was also a first-class cricketer for Yorkshire.

Confusion
He is not to be confused with another John Thomas Brown, who played more frequently for Yorkshire (and England) over a similar time span.  For clarity, the subject of this article is often described as Brown, J. T. (Darfield), the other as Brown, J. T. (Driffield).

References

External links
CricketArchive

1874 births
1950 deaths
Yorkshire cricketers
English cricketers
People from Darfield, South Yorkshire
Cricketers from Yorkshire